Anhelina Kalinina was the defending champion, but chose not to participate.

Sofia Kenin won the title, defeating Grace Min in an all-American final, 4–6, 6–1, 6–4.

Seeds

Main draw

Finals

Top half

Bottom half

References 
 Main draw

FSP Gold River Women's Challenger - Singles
FSP Gold River Women's Challenger